DJ supergroup Swedish House Mafia has received numerous awards and nominations. The group are best known for the songs "Don't You Worry Child" and "Save the World" and the albums Until One and Until Now. The aforementioned songs have been nominated for Best Dance Recording at the Grammy Awards and Best Single at the Grammis Awards. Having won ten awards at the International Dance Music Awards for "Don't You Worry Child", "Save the World", "One (Your Name)" and "Leave the World Behind", Swedish House Mafia has received other awards and nominations at the Billboard Music Awards, DJ Awards, European Border Breakers Award, MTVs European Music Awards and Teen Choice Awards.

Billboard Music Awards

DJ Awards

DJ Magazine top 100 DJs

European Border Breakers Award

Grammis Awards

Grammy Awards

International Dance Music Awards

MTVs European Music Awards

Teen Choice Awards

YouTube Creator Awards
Swedish House Mafia  (2.19 million subscribers - May 2020)

References 

Lists of awards received by Swedish musician
Lists of awards received by musical group